The Generation of the Future of Austria, abbreviated to GZÖ, is the youth wing of the Alliance for the Future of Austria, a conservative liberal political party in Austria.

The party was formed in August 2005 by a unification of youth groups from various states.

The GZÖ has called for the introduction of tuition fees of €500 per term and a €5,000 registration fee refundable upon graduation.

Footnotes

External links
  Generation of the Future of Austria official website

Alliance for the Future of Austria
Youth wings of political parties in Austria
Political parties established in 2005
2005 establishments in Austria